Stuart James Davidson (born 8 March 1972) is a Zimbabwean-born former Scottish cricketer.  Davidson was a right-handed batsman who bowled right-arm medium pace.

Davidson made his List A debut for Scotland against the Middlesex Cricket Board in the 1st round of the 2002 Cheltenham & Gloucester Trophy which was played in 2001 to avoid fixture congestion the following season.  Scotland won this match to proceed to the 2nd round which was also held in 2001, where they played Dorset.  Davidson's third and final List A appearance for Scotland came in the 3rd round of the same competition against Surrey, this time played in 2002.  A bowler, he took 7 wickets in his three matches at an average of 12.14, with best figures of 4/43.

References

External links
Stuart Davidson at ESPNcricinfo
Stuart Davidson at CricketArchive

1972 births
Zimbabwean people of British descent
White Rhodesian people
Living people
Sportspeople from Harare
Zimbabwean emigrants to the United Kingdom
Scottish cricketers
Scotland cricketers